{{Infobox Australian road
| type         = Road
| road_name    = Parramatta Road
| state        = nsw
| image        = Parramatta Road near University of Sydney.jpg
| caption      = 
| est          = 1811
| length       =23
| route        = 
| former       = see Former route allocations
| direction_a  = East
| end_a        =  Broadway
| exits        = 
| direction_b  = West
| end_b        =  Church Street| through      = Ultimo, Chippendale, Glebe, Camperdown, Forest Lodge, Annandale, Stanmore, Leichhardt. Petersham, Lewisham, Haberfield, Summer Hill Ashfield. Five Dock, Croydon, Concord, Burwood, Strathfield, Homebush, Auburn}}Parramatta Road' is the major historical east-west artery of metropolitan Sydney, New South Wales, Australia, connecting the Sydney CBD with Parramatta. It is the easternmost part of the Great Western Highway. Since the 1990s its role has been augmented by the City West Link and M4 Motorway.

The road begins in the east as a continuation of George Street, which becomes Broadway west of Harris Street, and Parramatta Road west of the City Road junction, and ends at the junction with Church Street in Parramatta. Its  distance is dominated by caryards and small marginally-viable shops. At the same time, however, it has over 100 abandoned and derelict stores. Owing to this and its abrasively noisy traffic, it has rarely been considered beautiful.

Opened in 1811, it is one of Sydney's oldest roads and Australia's first road between two cities (before Sydney and Parramatta coalesced). As at 2015, over three million commuters every year drove Parramatta Road. The road is the hub of Sydney's motor dealership industry - with 67% of the adjacent land used for motor retailing and services.

History

1790s–1800s: Development

British settlement in Parramatta began in the same year (1788) as it did in Sydney. The Parramatta River was used as navigation between them. Sometime between 1789 and 1791 an overland track was made to provide an official land route between the two settlements.

Parramatta Road dates to the 1792 formation of a route linking Sydney to the settlement of Parramatta. This route was formalised under the direction of Surveyor-General Augustus Alt in 1797. Parramatta Road became one of the colony's most important early roads, and for many years remained one of Sydney's principal thoroughfares.
The early road was a poorly built and poorly maintained track through bush. In 1794, the governor of the colony reported that he had caused a very good road to be made, but there is no evidence that any bridges were built over the streams. The road subsequently deteriorated and on 9 June 1805 the Sydney Gazette reported that the road was impassable as the result of heavy rain. Attempts to improve the road continued over the years.

1810–1815
By 1811, Parramatta Road had officially opened to traffic and was financed during a large portion of the 19th century by a toll, with toll booths located at what now is Sydney University and the Duck River. Governor Macquarie called tenders for the repair of the road, raised a three shilling per gallon levy on spirits and levied a toll to pay for the work. The road was to be 10 metres wide. This turnpike road was opened on 10 April 1811. The toll barriers were at the present Railway Square and at Becket's Creek (near Parramatta).

In 1814, a stage cart service was established along Parramatta Road. Fares were 10 shillings for passengers and 3 pence for letters. Heavy rain again nearly destroyed this road, so in 1817 it was announced that all tree-stumps would be removed and the road paved with stone which would be covered with earth and gravel. This improvement was announced as finished on 15 January 1815.

In 1815 the "profit" from the Sydney toll reached £465. The growth of Sydney caused the toll barrier to be moved to Grose Farm (present University of Sydney) in April 1836. In 1839 it was moved further west to Annandale.

1820s–1880s

The colony's first stage coach (valued at £300) was imported in 1821 but did not begin regular service until 1823. The stage left the city at 7:00 am, arrived in Parramatta at 9:30 am and left Parramatta for the return journey at 4:00 pm. Inside passengers were charged six shillings. Hazards on the road included the threat of attacks by Indigenous people and bushrangers. Hotels and settlements sprang up along the road to serve coaching traffic.

The importance of the road declined with the advent of the Sydney-Parramatta railway in 1855. In 1883, a steam tram line opened along Parramatta Road as far as Annandale, and was extended onward to Norton Street in 1884, where it turned to run along Norton Street to Short Street.

In the 1800s, the government acquired a strip of land from Ashfield to Burwood from the Rosebank Estate, owned by the Sisters of the Good Samaritan, Australia's first religious congregation. Rosebank College now stands on the former Rosebank Estate, and the heritage-listed building of the private school stands adjacent to the road at Five Dock.

1900s–present: Motorisation
Sydney Municipal Council began widening the major routes into the city centre in 1911, including the construction of Broadway and the widening of the cutting on Parramatta Road adjacent to Sydney University. In the 1920s, the road was sealed and tramlines were removed from the road. Sheep and cattle were still crossing Parramatta Road at Homebush as late as the 1960s.

Increased traffic congestion along the road steadily made it less attractive for residential and commercial use during the 20th century. By the last quarter of the 20th century, the only active businesses on many stretches of the road were car dealerships. The decline of industry in the Inner West also drove the decline of commercial areas formerly catering to factory workers. By the end of the 20th century, proposals to revitalise Parramatta Road and make it more attractive were regularly made.

One of these proposals was made in 2012, which would have widened and lowered the road below street level in a "slot" as part of the Roads & Maritime Services WestConnex motorway proposal. This plan was abandoned, and the WestConnex proposal was later changed to a pair of tunnels parallel to Parramatta Road and connecting to the existing M4 motorway. The new extension was known as M4 East and was eventually built between the end of the existing M4 motorway in North Strathfield and Haberfield, where it connected to the A4 road. The new tunnels opened to traffic in July 2019. The project resulted in the creation of a new entry and exit ramp on Parramatta Road in Ashfield, the narrowing of westbound traffic lanes for through-traffic to one lane at either end of the tunnel, and the demolition of a large number of houses in Ashfield and Haberfield to make way for the tunnel ramps.

Criticism
 
The road has been criticised by the community for its traffic pollution, congestion, and for its vacant shops and rundown buildings, particularly between Leichhardt and Concord, and local government has been accused of failing to adopt policies to encourage the redevelopment and regeneration of vacant sites.

A local mayor described it as a "varicose vein". A NSW Business Chamber Executive Patricia Forsythe said that the road is "one of the least attractive commercial areas of Sydney". Former NSW premier Nick Greiner thought the road looked "like Beirut on a bad day". The Sydney Morning Herald writer Elizabeth Farrelly described it as "filthy, noisy, sclerotic and dull". On a lighter note, Tess De Quincey, an Australian performer/director said, "Every chapter of Sydney's history has been written on Parramatta Road." A Sydney Morning Herald editor said that whilst the road is "ugly in parts, drab in others, and generally unpleasant", it is still "fundamental to the economic and social viability of the greater city".

Since the 1970s many buildings fronting Parramatta Road, especially those in the prime locations of the Inner West (from Newtown to Homebush), have become vacant and fallen into disrepair, with many vandalised. Previously these buildings were a major part of local life for the suburbs along Parramatta Road, providing employment, retailing and other services. The buildings with graffiti and broken windows provide a sight that is sought out by graffiti vandals and proficient urban photographers.

Nicholas Munning, an owner of a music store in Annandale, described the road as, "A lost cause...You can see the hodgepodge of buildings - abandoned buildings, abandoned shops - [with people thinking] let’s just let this sit here for four years until we get council approval to knock it down and build apartments...They don’t care if it sits there vacant with broken windows and looks like shit, The problem is the whole road looks like that. So nobody is going to say, 'hey, this is a great area. I’m going to spend $x making a really classy looking shop or restaurant'.”

 Redevelopment plan 
The Government of New South Wales published the 'Parramatta Road Urban Transformation Strategy' in 2016, with a 30-year plan for redeveloping the area through planning and infrastructure investment. Among the strategy's goals are housing an additional 56,000 people in 27,000 new homes on the corridor (with minimum five percent affordable housing); 50,000 workers employed in the area; and 66 hectares of new open space is provided through linear parks and along watercourses or infrastructure.

The proposed development rights are worth millions of dollars to developers but are also controversial due to the density of some of the proposals and the likely impact on an already over-congested road. As a result, many of the development proposals are controversial with local residents and are opposed by local councils. A number of the disputes between developers and councils have led to court disputes.

The Inner West Council and City of Canada Bay, through which the road runs for much of its length, have proposed using an electric guided bus running on the centre of the road for public transport, as opposed to kerbside buses as suggested in the strategy.

Location

The highway forms the boundaries of various suburbs along the way and ends at the junction of Church Street, Parramatta, where the Great Western Highway briefly turns to the north. Parramatta Road forms the southern boundary of the following suburbs:

 Ultimo
 Glebe
 Forest Lodge
 Annandale
 Leichhardt
 Haberfield
 Five Dock
 Concord

Parramatta Road forms the northern boundary of the following suburbs:

 Chippendale
 Camperdown
 Stanmore
 Lewisham
 Petersham
 Summer Hill
 Ashfield
 Croydon
 Burwood

West of Concord and Burwood, Parramatta Road passes through Strathfield, Homebush, Auburn and Granville before reaching Parramatta.

Former route numbers
Parramatta Road has many former route allocations including former National Route 32. Where and when the former route numbers were implemented are stated below.Chippendale – Summer Hill: National Route 32 
 Metroad 4 
 Metroad 5 
 State Route 31 
 A22 Summer Hill – Haberfield: National Route 32 
 Metroad 4 
unallocated: Haberfield – North Strathfield: National Route 32 
 Metroad 4 
 A4 
 A44 North Strathfield – Auburn: National Route 32 
 State Route 44 
 A44 Auburn – Clyde: National Route 32 
 State Route 44 
 A44 Clyde – Granville:''
 National Route 32 
 State Route 44 
 A44

References

External links
History of Parramatta Road Office of Environment & Heritage

Streets in Sydney
Transport infrastructure in Parramatta
Historical roads of New South Wales
Inner West
Municipality of Strathfield
Parramatta Road, Sydney